Kendriya Vidyalaya, Patiala is a higher-secondary co-education government school in the Patiala city of Punjab, India. The school was founded in 1974 and is affiliated to the Central Board of Secondary Education of India. The school is administered by the Kendriya Vidyalaya Trust.

References 

Kendriya Vidyalayas
Co-educational schools in India
High schools and secondary schools in Patiala
Educational institutions established in 1974
1974 establishments in Punjab, India